Ayman Shawky Kusowa, born on 9 December 1962, was an Egyptian international striker who played most of his career with El-Ahly and a short spell with Zamalek SC.

He worked as a teacher and a coach at the King Abdullah Academy in Virginia, United States.

He participated in the 1990 World Cup in Italy.

Clubs 
Koroum (Egypt)
Ahly (Egypt)
Zamalek (Egypt)
Koroum (Egypt)

Titles 
Personal Titles
Egyptian League Top Scorer (1983/84) with Koroum Club
Scored 15 goals in African Club Cups (4th highest all-time record)

For Ahly
6 Egyptian League titles
5 Egyptian Cup titles
1 African Champions League title
3 African Cup Winners' Cup titles
1 Afro-Asian Cup titles

For Zamalek
1 African Champions League title

References

1962 births
Living people
Egyptian footballers
Egypt international footballers
1990 FIFA World Cup players
Zamalek SC players
Egyptian Premier League players
Association football forwards